Sorbus maderensis, a rowan, is a species of plant in the family Rosaceae. It is endemic to Madeira.  It is threatened by habitat loss.

Etymology
Sorbus is the Latin name for the fruit of the service tree. Maderensis means 'from Madeira'.

References

External links
 

Endemic flora of Madeira
maderensis
Critically endangered plants
Taxonomy articles created by Polbot
Taxobox binomials not recognized by IUCN